Semenikha is a rural locality (a village) and the administrative center of Ilyinskoye Rural Settlement, Kharovsky District, Vologda Oblast, Russia. The population was 246 as of 2002.

Geography 
Semenikha is located 18 km northeast of Kharovsk (the district's administrative centre) by road. Kuzminskaya is the nearest rural locality.

References 

Rural localities in Kharovsky District